Red Shadows is an original science fiction novel written by Mitchel Scanlon and based on the British comic strip Anderson:Psi Division (a spin-off from Judge Dredd) in 2000 AD. It is Scanlon's second Anderson novel.

Synopsis
Anderson pursues a vicious serial killer, only to become his next target.

External links
 Review at 2000adreview
 Entry at Fiction DB

Judge Anderson novels